The Sulawesian shrew rat (Melasmothrix naso) is a species of rodent in the family Muridae.  It is the only species in the genus Melasmothrix.
It is found only in central Sulawesi, Indonesia, and is known from the localities of Rano Rano and Mount Nokilalaki.

These small-bodied rodents live at high altitudes, reaching up to 7500 feet. Specifically, in places that maintain wet, cool conditions like moss forests.

References

Rats of Asia
Endemic fauna of Indonesia
Rodents of Sulawesi
Endangered fauna of Asia
Taxa named by Ned Hollister
Taxa named by Gerrit Smith Miller Jr.
Mammals described in 1921
Taxonomy articles created by Polbot
Old World rats and mice